Xiphodontidae is an extinct  family of even-toed ungulates (order Artiodactyla), endemic to Europe during the Eocene 40.4—33.9 million years ago, existing for about 7.5 million years. They were, most likely, all terrestrial herbivores. Paraxiphodon suggests that they survived into the Lower Oligocene, at least.

Taxonomy
The Xiphodontidae were named by Flower (1883). It was assigned to Artiodactyla by Cope (1889); to Xiphodontoidea by Hooker (1986); and to Tylopoda by Carroll (1988).

References

Tylopoda
Eocene even-toed ungulates
Prehistoric mammals of Europe
Prehistoric mammal families